La Cueva is a Dominican village, municipal district of Cevicos, in the Sánchez Ramírez Province.

References

Sources 
 – World-Gazetteer.com

Populated places in Sánchez Ramírez Province
Municipalities of the Dominican Republic